Pirates of the Coast (also known as Pirates of the Barbary Coast) is a 1960 Italian adventure film directed by Domenico Paolella.

Cast 
Lex Barker as Luis Monterey 
Estella Blain as Isabella
Livio Lorenzon as Olonese
Liana Orfei as Anna del Peru
Loris Gizzi as Don Fernando
John Kitzmiller as Rock
Nino Vingelli as Porro
Ignazio Balsamo as Brook 
Gérard Landry as The Prosecutor

References

External links

1960 films
1960 adventure films
Films directed by Domenico Paolella
Pirate films
Italian adventure films
1960s Italian-language films
1960s Italian films